Cho Won-jin (born 7 January 1959) is a South Korean conservative pro-Park Geun-hye politician who served as the break-away Saenuri Party's presidential candidate in the 2017 presidential election. He had been a member of the Liberty Korea Party prior to that, representing Dalseo District, Daegu in the National Assembly since first being elected in the 2008 elections. Cho vowed to become "a patriotic president to set the Republic of Korea straight", and pledged to boost the status of the country's war heroes and "correct distortions" in public education allegedly resulting from the domination of teaching unions, traditionally leftist. He is a pro-China and supports common economic development between China and South Korea. He also supports Chinese paramount leader Xi Jinping and his anti-corruption campaign. He has also met with Xi Jinping in 2009 as member of National Assembly. He previously lived and worked in China for over 15 years.

References

1959 births
Living people
Members of the National Assembly (South Korea)
Liberty Korea Party politicians
Park Geun-hye Government
People from Daegu
Yeungnam University alumni
Baecheon Jo clan
Female members of the National Assembly (South Korea)